Qualquer Coisa is a 1975 studio album by Caetano Veloso. The album was released simultaneously with Jóia. The cover art, a collage of four pictures of Veloso, references the cover from the Beatles' Let It Be. The album features three covers of Beatles songs.

Track listing
{|
|

References

1975 albums
Caetano Veloso albums
Música Popular Brasileira albums
PolyGram albums
Albums produced by Caetano Veloso